Carole Knight, married name Moore, is a female former international table tennis player from England.

Table tennis career
She represented England at the 1975 World Table Tennis Championships and 1977 World Table Tennis Championships in the Corbillon Cup (women's team event).

She won seven English National Table Tennis Championships, (three singles, three doubles and one mixed doubles as Carole Moore) and two European Table Tennis Championships medals.

See also
 List of England players at the World Team Table Tennis Championships

References

English female table tennis players
1957 births
Living people